Michael Hametner (born 1950 at Rostock) is a German–Austrian journalist, editor, writer and literary and theater critic

Life 

Hametner, son of an Austrian citizen, studied journalism and literary studies at the University of Leipzig. Initially working as an actor and director he became leading the "Poetische Theater" at the University of Leipzig; where he played and directed Der Auftrag by Heiner Müller (as "Debuisson"), Kohlhaas,  version of Kleists novel (as "Luther"), Stephan Hermlins Scardanelli (Premiere), Edward Albees Die Zoogeschichte (first performance in East Germany), Alexander Vampilovs Provinzanekdoten and Samuel Beckett's Waiting for Godot (as Pozzo). As director he also played in important role in the debut performance of Astoria by Austrian writer Jura Soyfer in East Germany (together with Bernhard Scheller).

From the beginning of the 1990s Hametner had been working as a freelancer at Mitteldeutscher Rundfunk (MDR). In 1993 he was appointed jury member for "Hörspiel des Monats" ("Radio drama of the month"). Since 2007 Hametner is also member of the jury for the Uwe Johnson Prize. In 1994 he became editorial journalist and presenter for literature at Mitteldeutscher Rundfunk, where he established the MDR-Literaturpreis (MDR literature prize) in 1995.

Hametner published several books containing one-on-one interviews with German painters and actors like Bernhard Heisig, Johannes Heisig, Sighard Gille and Fred Delmare.

Hametner has also been working as a narrator for audio recordings since 2005. Until 2015 he had been editorial journalist for literature. Since 2008 he is member of Bührnheim's Literature Salon.

Hametner lives in Leipzig.

Works (selection) 

Author
 Kleine Form des Theaters. Zentralhaus-Publikation, Leipzig 1986.
 Neue und wiederentdeckte Gegenwarts-Dramatik aus der DDR. Zentralhaus-Publikation, Leipzig 1989, .
 Kleine Leute. Das Leben des Schauspielers Fred Delmare. Schwarzkopf und Schwarzkopf, Berlin 1997, .
 Einkreisen. 15 Gespräche – ein Porträt des Malers Sighard Gille. Mitteldeutscher Verlag, Halle 2014, .
 Auf der Bühne. 15 Gespräche – ein Porträt des Malers Matthias Weischer. Mitteldeutscher Verlag, Halle 2016, .
 Übermalen. 15 Gespräche – ein Porträt des Malers Johannes Heisig. Mitteldeutscher Verlag, Halle 2017, .
 Bernhard Heisig und Gudrun Brüne. Ein Künstlerpaar über fünfzig Jahre. Mitteldeutscher Verlag, Halle (Saale) 2018, .
 Gert Pötzschig – Valeurs. Sax, Beucha/Markkleeberg 2018, .
 Kopfkino. 15 Gespräche – ein Porträt des Malers Hans Aichinger. Mitteldeutscher Verlag, Halle (Saale) 2019, 

Publisher
 Zornesrot. Anthologie junger Autoren. Mitteldeutscher Verlag, Halle 2007, .
 Zeit der Witze. Texte junger Autoren. Mitteldeutscher Verlag, Halle 2009, .
 Wolfgang Heger: Lichtzeichen. Ein Porträt des Malers Rolf-Gunter Dienst im Dialog. Mitteldeutscher Verlag, Halle 2015, .

Audiobook narrator

At Universal Music, Berlin:
 Wahnsinn Fußball! Bundesliga-Geschichten aus vier Jahrzehnten. 2005, .
 Pferde sind meine Freunde. Der richtige Umgang mit Pferden. 2005, .
 Hunde richtig kennen und verstehen. So wird Ihr Hund zum besten Freund. 2005, .

At Universal Family Entertainment, Berlin:
 Fritz Hennenberg: Wolfgang Amadeus Mozart. 2006, .
 Alan Posener: William Shakespeare. 2006, .
 Klaus Schröter: Thomas Mann. 2006, .
 Barbara Meier: Robert Schumann. 2006, .
 Peter Boerner: Johann Wolfgang von Goethe. 2006, .
 Christian Liedtke: Heinrich Heine. 2006, .
 Wolfgang Emmerich: Gottfried Benn. 2006, .
 Heimo Rau: Gandhi. 2006, .
 Hans Wißkirchen: Die Familie Mann. 2006, .
 Stefana Sabin: Andy Warhol. 2006, .
 Claudia Pilling, Diana Schilling, Mirjam Springer: Friedrich Schiller. 2007, .
 Frank Niess: Che Guevara. 2007, .

References

External links 
 Michael Hametner at Website of Rotbuch-Verlag
 Michael Hametner at Die Horen (Morawietz)
 Am Anfang fast ein Fehlstart – article about MDR literature-prize

Austrian editors
German editors
German opinion journalists
Literary editors
German journalists
East German writers
German male poets
Austrian journalists
Austrian poets
Writers from Leipzig
Living people
1950 births
20th-century German male writers
German male non-fiction writers
German radio journalists
German radio presenters
Austrian radio presenters
Mitteldeutscher Rundfunk people
Audiobook narrators
20th-century essayists
21st-century essayists
German theatre critics
Austrian theatre critics